Jenderal Ahmad Yani International Airport  is an airport that serves the city of Semarang, in Central Java, Indonesia. The airport is named in honor of Ahmad Yani (1922–1965), who is a National Hero of Indonesia. , it was one of the fastest-growing airports in the world by growth percentage. It became an international airport with the first flight of Garuda Indonesia to Singapore in August 2004. The airport is operated by PT Angkasa Pura I, a state enterprise of the Indonesian Ministry of Transport that manages airports in the eastern part of the country.

The airport used to be a military airbase owned by the TNI (Armed Forces of Indonesia) until 1966, when the airport was declared open to domestic commercial flights, while continuing to operate as an airbase for the Indonesian Army. The area is commonly known as Kalibanteng, hence it was commonly known as Kalibanteng Airbase. The new floating terminal of the airport was officially opened by Indonesian President Joko Widodo on 7 June 2018.

History
Ahmad Yani International Airport used to be a military airbase for the Indonesian Army. It was opened for commercial flights after a joint decree between Chief of the Air Staff, Minister of Transport, and the Army Chief of staff on 31 August 1966. Since 1 October 1995, management was transferred to PT Angkasa Pura I. This marked the start of the fully commercial function of the airport until now.

Expansion began in 2004, done in phases starting with the addition to the length of the runway to accommodate the safer landing of larger aircraft. The airport gained its international status in August 2004 with its inaugural flight from Semarang to Singapore, as mentioned in the Minister's Decree No. 64/2004 on 10 August 2004. However, due to the global recession, the Semarang-Singapore route operated by Garuda was discontinued. Batavia Air took over this route in November 2009. However, Batavia Air ceased operations on 31 January 2013 as an outcome of a petition for bankruptcy on 30 January 2013.

Development
Ahmad Yani International Airport used to have a terminal to the south of the runway, with one arrival and departure gate each for domestic and international flights. The old terminal had a total area of 6,708 square meters in size. Facilities include souvenir shops, food outlets, bank, money changer, hotel and travel booking offices, taxi and rental car services. The airport is in the coastal area of Maron beach in the West Semarang district, which is prone to flooding and abrasion.

Central Java Government announced plans to expand the airport in 2004 which include the extension of the runway from 1,850 m to 2,560 m.

On 17 June 2014 Angkasa Pura I and military officials signed an agreement allowing the use of military land for 30 years and implementing the expansion project.

New terminal
On 17 June 2014, groundbreaking was done to build a new terminal for the airport.

On 6 June 2018, the new terminal was opened for the public. It is the first floating terminal in Indonesia, which has an area of 58,652 square metres, nearly 10 times larger in size than the old terminal. After the new terminal was opened, the old terminal was returned to the army. The new terminal is also equipped with three jet bridges.

The new terminal is designed on an eco-friendly theme, to register the terminal for green building certification. The unique passenger terminal built on top of a swamp, set to turn the airport into Indonesia's very first floating airport. The construction of the new terminal uses Earth-conscious materials and makes use of its surrounding swamps. The new terminal mainly uses glass materials to acquire more natural lighting inside the terminal, which saves electricity. Another eco-friendly design element is the airport's "reverse osmosis" technology to provide clean water by using rainwater and seawater, which is processed in a groundwater tank located underneath the airport terminal. There are water ponds around the airport that provides the raw material for osmosis and control water levels to prevent flooding during the rainy season. Solar cells also contribute to the airport's street lighting. The new terminal has an interior garden, as well as a mangrove forest.

There is a multisensory waiting room specifically for autistic children, which is equipped with floor and wall mattresses, balls, beanbags, aquatic bubble tubes, colour changing LEDs, laser fingers, and vestibular boards. The multisensory room is the first-ever sensory room at any Indonesian airport and also the first in the Asia-Pacific.

Airlines and destinations

Passenger

Cargo

Statistics

Accidents and incidents
 On 1 May 1981, Vickers Viscount 832 PK-RVN of Mandala Airlines carrying 44 passengers and crew was damaged beyond economic repair when it departed the runway on landing, causing the starboard and nose gear to collapse.
 On 18 October 1992, Merpati Nusantara Airlines Flight 5601 operating a CASA/IPTN CN-235-10 PK-MNN crashed on a domestic flight from Semarang to Bandung. The aircraft impacted Mount Papandayan and burst into flames, killing all 27 passengers and 4 crew aboard. It is the worst disaster involving a CASA/IPTN CN-235.
 On 30 November 1994, A Fokker 28 Mk 4000 PK-GKU of Merpati Nusantara Airlines operating on flight 422 from Jakarta touched down during heavy rain far along the runway. Then it overran the runway and fell into a ditch, causing it to break into three pieces. All 85 passengers and crew survived.
 On 25 December 2016, Wings Air flight IW1896 from Bandung, using an ATR 72-600 (registration PK-WGW) suffered a landing accident. At the time of the approach, it was raining at the airport with Cumulonimbus clouds in the area at 1500 feet. Following a VOR/DME approach, the aircraft landed on runway 13 and bounced; the right main gear then folded inwards causing the aircraft to veer right. The aircraft stopped on the right runway edge near taxiway D tilting to the right. All 68 passengers and 4 crew survived.

Ground transportation

Bus
From 2005 until 2007 there was a shuttle bus service connecting the airport to the city center and Semarang Old Town. However, due to protests from local airport taxi operators, this service was terminated.

In 2013, Trans Semarang, a bus rapid transit (BRT) operator, started to serve Ahmad Yani Intl Airport. Only one route went through the airport but all the available routes are interconnected. The expected interval is 15 to 30 minutes between buses unless there is a traffic jam.

Car and taxi
There are Airport taxis provided and the reception available right in the arrival terminal. Some public taxis in Semarang can't take passengers in the airport terminal.

Awards
For the third consecutive year, Ahmad Yani Airport won the Cleanest Airport Award among 9 Class B Airports in Indonesia in 2013.

Gallery

References

External links
 PT. Angkasa Pura I: Ahmad Yani Airport 
 Ahmad Yani Airport Website
 

Buildings and structures in Semarang
Transport in Central Java
Airports in Central Java
Military installations of Indonesia